The Houtman Abrolhos, an island chain off the coast of Western Australia, is recognised as containing 24 terrestrial reptile species, plus the marine green turtle (Chelonia mydas) which is often observed in large numbers near shore. This is a list of reptiles of the Houtman Abrolhos:

References

Further reading
 

Houtman Abrolhos
Reptiles
Houtman Abrolhos